Luis Arturo Paiva Renfigo (born 22 September 1987) is a Venezuelan Paralympic athlete who competes in international elite competitions in sprinting and middle-distance running events. He is a Parapan American Games champion and is also a Paralympic and World silver medalist.

References

1987 births
Living people
Sportspeople from Caracas
Paralympic athletes of Venezuela
Venezuelan male sprinters
Venezuelan male middle-distance runners
Athletes (track and field) at the 2016 Summer Paralympics
Medalists at the 2016 Summer Paralympics
Medalists at the 2015 Parapan American Games
Medalists at the World Para Athletics Championships
20th-century Venezuelan people
21st-century Venezuelan people